Sorkheh Deh (also Romanized as Surkhdeh) is a village in Abarshiveh Rural District, in the Central District of Damavand County, Tehran Province, Iran. At the 2006 census, its population was 617, in 205 families.

References 

Populated places in Damavand County